The Runaway Summer of Davie Shaw is a children's novel by Mario Puzo, first published in 1966. The plot revolves around a boy named Davie Shaw, who is left with his grandparents for the summer while his parents take off on a round-the-world trip in celebration of their wedding anniversary. Davie has adventures of his own that take him throughout the United States on his pony.

1966 American novels
American children's novels
Novels by Mario Puzo
1966 children's books